Seven Brides for Seven Brothers may refer to:

 Seven Brides for Seven Brothers, 1954 musical film
 Seven Brides for Seven Brothers (musical), 1978 stage adaptation of the film
 Seven Brides for Seven Brothers (TV series), first broadcast in 1982